LATAM Airlines Perú (formerly LAN Perú S.A.) is an airline based in Lima, Peru. It is a subsidiary of LATAM Airlines Group, which owns 49% of the airline and flag carrier of Peru.  It operates scheduled domestic and international services. Its main hub is Jorge Chávez International Airport. LATAM Perú is the dominant airline in Peru, controlling 73.4% of the domestic market.

History

LAN Peru was established in July 1998 by LAN-Chile in Lima by the entrepreneurs Mr. Boris Hirmas Rubio, Lorenzo Sousa Debarbieri, Cristian Said and Dr Javier Rodriguez Larrain. Operations began on 2 July 1999, with domestic services from Jorge Chávez International Airport to Cusco and Arequipa. Its launch marked the reappearance of a major national airline in Peru after the demise of Aeroperú, Faucett Perú and others. An international service to Miami was added on 15 November 1999.

The airline became a subsidiary of LAN Airlines in September 2002, owned by LAN (49%), ER Larraín (30%) and Inversiones Aéreas (21%) and has 1,500 employees. In 2004, it was incorporated into LAN Airlines holding with the change of the name of the parent company.

During the third quarter of 2006, LAN Peru added 8 new Airbus A319s to its fleet, intended to replace its Boeing 737-200s for domestic operations in Peruvian territory. In October 2006, LAN Perú obtained authorization from the Peruvian DGAC to operate as an Aeronautical Maintenance Workshop (TMA), granting it the number 029. This allows it, in addition to supporting LAN operations, to offer service to other companies that Aircraft with Peruvian registration operate.

In 2008, the airline transported about 3.5 million passengers, with 2.9 million in the domestic market. In October 2009, the airline received the authorization to provide aircraft maintenance services.

As part of the merger between the parent company LAN Airlines and TAM Linhas Aéreas, which began in 2010, from which LATAM Airlines Group emerged, the airline was newly established as LATAM Airlines Perú on 5 May 2016.

Destinations

Codeshare agreements
LATAM Perú has codeshare agreements with the following airlines:
Korean Air
WestJet

Fleet

Current fleet

The LATAM Perú fleet consists of the following aircraft (as of November 2022):

Former fleet
The airline previously operated the following aircraft:

LATAM Pass
LATAM Pass is LATAM Perú's Frequent Flyer Program, shared with the parent company LATAM Airlines Group.

Accidents and incidents
On 18 November 2022, LATAM Perú Flight 2213, an Airbus A320neo (registered CC-BHB) was taking off from Jorge Chávez International Airport to Juliaca, when it collided with a fire engine that was crossing the runway, killing two firefighters and seriously injuring a third. All 102 passengers and 6 crew aboard the aircraft escaped with 4 suffering serious injuries and 36 suffering minor injuries.

See also
List of airlines of Peru

References

External links

Airlines of Peru
P
Latin American and Caribbean Air Transport Association
Former Oneworld affiliate members
Airlines established in 1998
Transport in Lima
1998 establishments in Peru